Fox News is a 24-hour cable and satellite news channel owned by Fox Corporation.

Fox News may also refer to:

 Fox News Radio, a syndicated radio service, a division of Fox News Media 
 Fox News Sunday, a weekly morning talk show broadcast by Fox Broadcasting Company stations and affiliates, and replayed during prime time on Fox News Channel
 Fox News Talk, a satellite radio service of Fox News Channel
 Fox News (1919–1930), a silent-era theatrical newsreel created by William Fox
 Fox Movietone News, a newsreel which began in 1928 in the United Kingdom and the United States
 Noticias MundoFox, national news division of the former Spanish-language network, MundoFox
 Fox News, a term used by some Fox Broadcasting Company stations and affiliates to brand their own local news operations

See also
List of Fox television affiliates (by U.S. state), listing the broadcast network's affiliate stations